The autonomic nerve is a small nerve which carries postganglionic sympathetic and parasympathetic neurons from the zygomaticotemporal nerve; a branch of the maxillary nerve, to the lacrimal nerve; a branch of the ophthalmic nerve. These neurons derive from the superior cervical ganglion and the pterygopalatine ganglion respectively. They will travel to the lacrimal gland via the lacrimal nerve. Parasympathetic will induce lacrimation and vice versa.

References 

Nerves